The 2016 European Junior Swimming Championships were held from 6–10 July 2016 in Hódmezővásárhely, Hungary. The Championships were organized by LEN, the European Swimming League, and were held in a 50-meter pool. The Championships were for girls aged 14–17 and boys age 15–18.

Results

Boys

Girls

Mixed events

Medal table

References

External links 
 
Results

European Junior Swimming Championships
European Junior Swimming Championships
International aquatics competitions hosted by Hungary
European Junior Swimming Championships
Swimming competitions in Hungary
European Junior Swimming Championships
European Junior Swimming Championships